The 1969 Winnipeg municipal election was held in October 1969 to elect mayors, councillors and school trustees in the City of Winnipeg and its suburban communities.  There was no mayoral election in Winnipeg.

Winnipeg

Each of Winnipeg's three municipal wards elected three councillors, via STV.  

Robert Taft, Warren Steen and June Westbury were elected for Ward One.  

Lloyd Stinson, Robert Steen and Alan Wade were elected for Ward Two. 
 
Slaw Rebchuk, Joseph Zuken and Nick Malanchuk were elected for Ward Three.

St. Vital

Municipal elections in Winnipeg
1969 in Manitoba
October 1969 events in Canada
Winnipeg